The Easter Lily is a badge in the shape of a calla lily flower, worn during Easter by Irish republicans as a symbol of remembrance for Irish republican combatants who died during or were executed after the 1916 Easter Rising. Depending on the political affiliations of the bearer, it can also commemorate members of the pre-Treaty Irish Republican Army, both post-Treaty Irish Republican Armies, and either the Provisional IRA or the Official IRA. It may also be used to commemorate members of the Irish National Liberation Army (INLA).

History

Introduction (1926) 
The Easter Lily was introduced in 1926 by Cumann na mBan. Proceeds from the sale of the badge went to the Irish Republican Prisoners' Dependants Fund. Traditionally, they were sold outside church gates on Easter Sunday and worn at republican commemorations. In the early years of their existence, people from a broad political spectrum – from Fianna Fáil to Sinn Féin – wore lilies, which were sold by members of those political parties as well as the Irish Republican Army (IRA), Fianna Éireann, and Conradh na Gaeilge.

Fianna Fáil alternatives (1930s) 
In the 1930s, relations between Fianna Fáil and the IRA deteriorated considerably. Following the murder by the IRA of Richard More O'Ferrall in February 1935, the Fianna Fáil leadership instructed party members to stop selling the lily as it was "the symbol of an organisation of whose methods we disapprove". For its Easter commemorations that same year, Fianna Fáil introduced a new symbol called the Easter Torch. This was sold for a number of years but was discontinued as the badge proved unpopular with the party grass roots, many of whom continued to wear the Easter Lily.

"Stickies" versus "Pinheads" (1967-1980s) 
At the 1967 Sinn Féin Ard Fheis a motion from the Tipperary Cummain calling for the Easter Lily to be supplied with a self-adhesive backing was passed. After the 1969/70 IRA split, which led to the emergence of the Provisional IRA, the Official IRA and Official Sinn Féin kept the Easter Lily with a self-adhesive backing while the Provisional's reverted to the traditional paper and pin Easter Lily. This led to the members of the Official IRA and Official Sinn Féin being referred to pejoratively as the "Stickies". On the other hand, the Provisionals became known as the "Pinheads", a nickname which has not lasted.

Growth in Provisional IRA identification (1990s-) 
Both the Officials and the Provisionals also saw the Easter Lily as a symbol of remembrance for their members who died on "active service". With the decline in the Official IRA, the Easter Lily became more and more associated with the Provos.

In the 1990s, metal versions of the Lily became popular and are worn by some at any time of the year. Their sales and usage has increased with the rise in electoral support of Sinn Féin.

Cumann na mBan continue the sale of the Easter Lily from their headquarters on 223 Parnell Street, Dublin.

In popular culture 
The Easter Lily is the title of a song by Derek Warfield and the Young Wolfe Tones, set to the Foxhunters Reel, released in their Call of Erin, Vol. 1 album a century to the day of the Easter Rising.

References

Sources 
An Phoblacht 5 April 2007
Cumann na mBan

External links 
CAIN
Sighle Humphreys

Irish Republican Army